La Sirène rouge (The Red Siren) is a 1993 crime novel by the French writer Maurice G. Dantec. It tells the story of a girl who confesses to the police that her mother is a dangerous murderer, and is joined by a former soldier as she goes into hiding, searching for her supposedly dead father. The book was Dantec's debut novel.

The novel received the 1994 Trophée 813 for best French-language crime novel of the year. It was adapted into the 2002 film The Red Siren, directed by Olivier Megaton and starring Jean-Marc Barr.

References

External links
 Publicity page at the publisher's website 

1993 Canadian novels
1993 French novels
French crime novels
French novels adapted into films
French-language novels
Novels by Maurice G. Dantec
1993 debut novels